Asterix and the Chariot Race (French: Astérix et la Transitalique, "Asterix and the Trans-Italic") is the 37th book in the Asterix series, and the third to be written by Jean-Yves Ferri and illustrated by Didier Conrad. The book was released worldwide in more than 20 languages on 19 October 2017 with an initial print run of 5 million copies.

Plot
Responding to criticism of the “deplorable” condition of Roman roads in the regions, Senator Lactus Bifidus proposes a chariot race across the Italic Peninsula to showcase the “excellent” roads. The race is open to all people of the known world. Julius Caesar endorses the race but insists that a Roman must win for the sake of unity across the Italic Peninsula. Otherwise, Bifidus will be banished and exiled to Cyrenaica (now Libya).

In Gaul, Asterix and Obelix are taking Geriatrix to a dentist at a market in Darioritum, when a sibyl predicts Obelix will become a champion charioteer. Obelix then buys a sports chariot on credit, quits his menhir business and joins the trans-Italic race, accompanied by Asterix and Dogmatix. Over the course of the race, they encounter a range of competitors from other lands, as well as the people and cuisines of Ancient Italy.  Their most important rival is the masked Coronavirus.

Only five teams manage to complete the race, with the two Gauls narrow victors over Julius Caesar, who had secretly joined the race as a replacement masked Coronavirus in an effort to save Rome's honor. Weary of the frantic pace of chariot racing, Obelix gives the trophy to Asterix, who hands it over to the Kushite team, who in turn give it to the Sarmatians. The trophy ends up with the perennially late Lusitanian team, who request the equivalent in sesterces. Obelix then declares he wants to return home and resume making menhirs.

Competitors

There are several other teams, including a Belgian named Outinthastix and his compatriot, two competitors who resemble Hells Angels, two Goths in a wolf-motif chariot, as well as Helvetians, Ligurians, Etruscans, and Calabrians. There is even an Arab team with dromedaries and a Nordic team on a sled.

Caricatures and references
Some of the characters in the book are obvious caricatures of real-life people. The innkeeper in Parma resembles opera singer Luciano Pavarotti, while the famous Roman masked charioteer Coronavirus is modeled on racing driver Alain Prost, and the garum tycoon Lupus is modeled on former Italian prime minister Silvio Berlusconi. French media noted that Nefersaynefer and Kweenlatifer resemble Venus and Serena Williams. Reviewers also noted a waitress at the roadside inn in Tibur resembles Italian actress Sophia Loren.
On page 24, the man sketching the race resembles Leonardo da Vinci. The statues and the mysterious beauty with the charming smile which Asterix and Obelix encounter in Florencia (Florence) are a nod to the city's later significance as the center and birthplace of the Italian Renaissance. The scenes in Sena Julia, where the racers are going in a circle searching for an inn, are a reference to the Palio di Siena and the Piazza del Campo.
While passing Pompeii, Obelix temporarily forestalls a catastrophic eruption of Mount Vesuvius.

Reception 
On Goodreads, Asterix and the Chariot Race has a score of 3.48 out of 5.

Comics Review said the book is "furiously funny and hilariously jam-packed with and timeless jibes and cracking contemporary swipes"

The book received renewed media attention in 2020 amid the severe acute respiratory syndrome coronavirus 2 (COVID-19) pandemic because the charioteer favored to win the race goes by the name Coronavirus and wears a face mask.

Notes
The English edition is the first Asterix album to be translated by Adriana Hunter, following the retirement of long-time translator Anthea Bell. At the end of the book, there is a message of thanks to Bell from the publishers for "her wonderful translation work on Asterix over the years".
On page 24, Asterix and Obelix pass a group of Gaulish tourists with a "house-wagon". This type of conveyance previously appeared in Asterix in Spain (1969).
On the race map, the city of Parma is marked with a leg of ham, which is in modern times one of its most famous exports.
On page 40, a Helvetian friend of Asterix and Obelix from Asterix in Switzerland makes a cameo appearance.
Beyond the Roman roadblock, Asterix and Obelix encounter "two indomitable Umbrians". The Umbri (as they were originally called) were conquered by Rome in 260 BC, and thus are an Italic counterpart of Asterix and his Gaulish companions
The Kushite princesses speaking only in hieroglyphs is probably a reference to the kingdom of Kush once belonging to the Egyptian empire.

References

External links 
Asterix and the Chariot Race Official Website

Chariot Race, Asterix and the
2017 graphic novels
Comics set in Florence
Comics set in Venice
Comics set in Italy